Tephrocybe rancida is a species of fungus in the family Lyophyllaceae.  It was first described by Swedish mycologist Elias Magnus Fries in 1821.  It is commonly called the Rancid Greyling due it's rancid smell and taste.

Description
Cap 1–4 cm in diameter.  Convex to flat, umbonate.  Grey to brown-grey starting with a whitish bloom.  Shiny when wet. Gills Free, crowded, grey.  Stem 4–8 cm long by 3–7 mm in diameter, concolorous with cap. Spores white or cream, ellipsoid, 7–8 × 3–4.5 m.

Distribution and habitat
Found growing from the ground, solitary in deciduous woodland. Early autumn to early winter. Rare. North America and Europe.

References

External links
 Tephrocybe rancida in Europe 

 C.rancida at Rogers Mushrooms

Lyophyllaceae
Fungi of North America
Fungi of Europe
Taxa named by Elias Magnus Fries
Fungi described in 1821